= League football =

League football may refer to:

- The sport of rugby league football
- The four fully professional divisions of English football, as opposed to semi-professional and amateur non-league football. See English football league system.
